The 2019–20 Conference USA men's basketball season began with practices in October 2019, followed by the start of the 2019–20 NCAA Division I men's basketball season in November. Conference play started in late December 2019 and will end in March 2020, after which 12 member teams will participate in the 2020 Conference USA tournament at The Ford Center at The Star in Frisco, Texas. The tournament champion is guaranteed a selection to the 2020 NCAA tournament.

Preseason 
Western Kentucky was picked as the favorite in the champion in the preseason poll of Conference USA's fourteen coaches.

Preseason Poll

() first place votes

Preseason All-Conference teams

Head coaches

Coaching changes 
On April 11, 2019, Southern Miss head coach Doc Sadler announced his resignation after 5 seasons at the school. 6 days later, the Eagles hired Southeastern Louisiana head coach and Southern Miss alum Jay Ladner for the head coaching job.

Coaches 

Notes: 
 All records, appearances, titles, etc. are from time with current school only. 
 Year at school includes 2019–20 season.
 Overall and C-USA records are from time at current school and are through the end of the 2018–19 season.

Conference matrix

All-Conference Teams and Awards

References